David Klein (born 13 August 1973 in Mulhouse, France) is a retired French goalkeeper.

Career 
His previous clubs include RC Strasbourg, FC Toulouse, AC Ajaccio and FC Metz.

References 

 CFA Foot 2008/2009
 David Klein - Strasbourg - Football sur 20minutes

1973 births
Living people
Footballers from Mulhouse
Association football goalkeepers
French footballers
RC Strasbourg Alsace players
Toulouse FC players
AC Ajaccio players
FC Metz players
Clydebank F.C. (1965) players
Partick Thistle F.C. players
FC Martigues players
La Roche VF players
Clermont Foot players
Valenciennes FC players
Chamois Niortais F.C. players
French expatriate footballers
Expatriate footballers in Scotland
Scottish Football League players
French expatriate sportspeople in Scotland